Leonard R. N. Ashley (born January 5, 1928 in Miami) is an American writer on the English language. He was for many years professor of English at Brooklyn College. (retired 2016) He was formerly on the editorial board of various academic journals in the US and abroad

He served as secretary of the International Linguistic Society (1980 - 1982)  and later was on its board, was vice-president of Amici Linguarum,  and participated in the International Conferences on Onomastic Sciences in Europe. He is a former member of the United States Board on Geographical Names.  is a president emeritus of The American Society of Geolinguistics. Aside from more traditional works on English drama. fiction, and poetry, and books on onomastics and geolinguistics, he is also known for his series of popular dictionaries of the occult. A recent installment in Dr. Ashley's series on the occult is the ultimate resource for information on the werewolf. He contributed a chronique (c. 35 pages each, thrice annually) of book reviews to Bibliothèque d'Humanuisme et Renaissance (Geneva) from the 1960s to the end of 2018 and published hundreds of book reviews in Names, Geolinguistics, etc. and articles in Names, Word Ways, Comments on Etymology, Etc., Journal of Popular Culture, Onomasica, Hamlet Studies, Points of View, and other academic journalsin the US and abroad. Some of his books have been published in Dutch,  Italian, German, and Norwegian translations as well as in US and UK editions.

Publications

English literature and linguistics

 George Peele: The Man and His Work 
 Colley Cibber
 Authorship and Evidence in Renaissance Drama 
 Unhappy all the time": Religion in Anthony Burgess's Earthly Powers
 What I Know About You: 100 Lesbian & Gay New York Voices (novel and play)
 Cornish Names 
 What's in a Name?: Everything You Wanted to Know (1989, revised 1995)
 Mexico: The Smart Traveler's Guide to All the Names 
 George Alfred Henty and the Victorian Mind
 Spenser's Ideal of the Gentleman 
 Geolinguistic Perspectives (ed., with Jesse Levitt & Kenneth H. Rogers)
 Ripley's "Believe It Or Not" Book of The Military 
 Language and Modern Society
 Language and the New Technology
 Language in Action
 Living Language 
 History of the Short Story 
 Art Attack: Names in Satire
 A Garland of Names (with Wayne H. Finke, eds.) 
 Names of Places
 Names in Literature
 Names in Popular Culture
 Animal Crackers (verse) and Poetry in Various Periodicals

Popular culture and the occult
 The Complete Book of Devils and Demons 
 The Complete Book of Vampires 
 The Complete Book of the Devil's Disciples 
 The Complete Book of Spells, Curses and Magical Recipes 
 The Complete Book of Ghosts and Poltergeists 
 The Complete Book of Werewolves 
 The Complete Book of Sex Magic 
 The Complete Book of Magic and Witchcraft (2 German editions) 
 The Amazing World Of Superstition 
 The Complete Book of Superstition, Prophecy and Luck (also in Dutch)
 Ripley's Believe it Or Not! Book of the Military 
 The Complete Book of Numerology (also in Italian) 
 The Complete book of Dreams and What They Mean
 The Wonderful World of Superstition, Prophecy, and Luck 
 Tales of Mystery and Melodrama
 Halloween
 Last Days: The Messiah, The Apocalypse, The Rapture, The Last Judgment

Folklore
 Elizabethan Popular Culture
 Nordic Folklore and Tradition (with Ola J. Holten) also published in Nynorsk in Sweden in a translation by Ola J. Holten and that some books on the occult are in UK as well as US editions and translations into Dutch, German, and Italian and some are reissued with new prefaces

Textbooks and translations 
 Other People's Lives
 Mirrors for Man; 26 Plays of the World Drama 
 6 Plays of World Drama (Taiwan) 
 Nineteenth-Century British Drama (Scott, Foresman reprinted revised by University Press of America)
 British Short Stories: Classics and Criticism (with Stuart L. Astor, Tales of Mystery and Melodrama)
 America: Naming the Country and Its People, Allen Walter Read, ed. L. R. N. Ashley)
 Colonial American English (Richard Lederer, ed. Ashley)
 A Garland of Names (ed. with Wayne H. Finke)
 A Narrative of the Life of Mrs. Charlotte Charke (ed.  Ashley) 
 Ballad Poetry of Ireland (ed. Ashley)
 Phantasms of the Living 2 vols., Myers, Podmore, Gurney, ed. Ashley)
 Reliques of Irish Poetry (ed. Ashley)
 Shakespeare's Jest Book (ed. Ashley)
 Suhrab and Rustum (ed. Ashley)

Conference proceedings 
 Geolinguistic Perspectives (ed. Ashley, Kenneth H. Rogers, Jesse Levitt)
 Constructed Language and Language Construction (ed. with Wayne H. Finke)
 Language across Border (ed. with Wayne H. Finke)
 Language and Communication in the New Century (ed. with Wayne H. Finke)
 Language and Identity (ed. with Wayne H. Finke)
 Language and Politics (ed. with Wayne H. Finke)
 Language and Popular Culture (ed. with Wayne H. Finke)
 Language in Contemporary Society (ed with Wayne H. Finke)
 Language in the Era of Globalization (ed. with Wayne H. Finke)
 Language under Controls (ed. with Wayne H. Finke)

References

1928 births
American non-fiction writers
Living people
Writers from Miami
Brooklyn College faculty